The D2.0-Box  is an Italian gallery of modern art and contemporary art in Caserta da Angelo Marino.  It is associated with the contemporary art gallery dirartecontemporanea 2.0.

Exhibitions
 Friends.
 Reperti 
 Plus Ultra di Mafonso, fifteen years later 
 Mario Velocci    Spazio.Linea.Suono curated bay Martina Velocci d2.0-box To October 14, 2017
 Trovamento: frammenti di artisti in mostra da D2.0-box. 30 gennaio 2018
 My Work Tells My Story - #1 Chiara Coccorese  Maggio 2018
 Daniela Morante My Work Tells My Story Alfabeto Segnico  9 Giugno, 2018
 Gloria Pastore My Work Tells My Story L'Ermafrodita  23 giugno, 2018
 Maria Adele Del Vecchio  My Work Tells My Story  Mirrors  7 luglio 2018 d2.0-box supervisor Enzo Battarra

References

Bibliography
Vincenzo Trione (a cura di) Atlante dell’Arte Contemporanea a Napoli e in Campania 1966 — 2016 scheda Loredana Troise dirartecontemporanea 2.0 gallery pag. 245, Electa 2017

External links
  Dirartecontemporanea 2.0 
 https://www.instagram.com/amarino2.0_gallery/

Contemporary art galleries in Italy